Cornelis Kist (born 7 August 1952) is a Dutch former professional footballer and manager. He played as a striker, and most notably won the European Golden Shoe for the 1978–79 season.

Club career
Born in Steenwijk, Kist started his career at SC Heerenveen after coming over from youth club VV Steenwijk in 1970. Two other family members already played at this club: his cousin and namesake Cees Kist ("Big Kees") and the defender Teun Kist. Kees Kist would later mainly appear for AZ'67. He was the main goalscorer of AZ, who during six consecutive seasons from 1976–77 to 1981–82 finished in the top 4 in the league table of the Eredivisie. 

Together with Austrian Kurt Welzl and the Volendam native Pier Tol, he led the AZ offense to a league title in the 1980–81 season; twelve points ahead of Ajax and also outperforming the Dutch giants on goal difference by +71 against +34. Their performances also led to KNVB Cup wins in 1978, 1981 and 1982, and the 1981 UEFA Cup Final. In addition to strikers Welzl and Tol, Kist also played at AZ'67 together with, among others, midfielders Peter Arntz and Jan Peters and centre backs Ronald Spelbos and John Metgod.

Kist was renowned for his hard shot. He won the European Golden Shoe of the 1978–79 season with 34 goals in the Eredivisie, making him the first Dutch footballer to win this award. He also won the Eredivisie Golden Boot twice. In the summer of 1982, Kist left AZ for French club Paris Saint-Germain, and was sent on loan to recently relegated FC Mulhouse for the 1983–84 season. He returned to his old club AZ in late summer 1984, before retiring as part of his first senior club, Heerenveen, under head coach Foppe de Haan. Kist scored a total of 212 goals in the Eredivisie, which puts him in fourth place on the all-time leaders list, behind Willy van der Kuijlen, Ruud Geels and Johan Cruijff.

After his career, he has worked as a reporter for De Telegraaf, and sells shoes.

The AZ home ground, AFAS Stadion, has a Kees Kist Lounge.

International career

He obtained 21 caps for the Netherlands national team, in which he scored four goals, in the years 1975–1980.

Managerial career
From 2000 through 2005 Kist managed HSV Hoek. He has also coached Steenwijker Boys and Tolbert.

Honours
AZ
Eredivisie: 1980–81
KNVB Cup: 1977–78, 1980–81, 1981–82

Paris Saint-Germain
 Coupe de France: 1982–83

Individual
Eredivisie Golden Boot: 1978–79, 1979–80
European Golden Shoe: 1978–79

Further reading

References

External links

 VoetbalStats 
 

1952 births
Living people
People from Steenwijkerland
Dutch footballers
Footballers from Overijssel
Association football forwards
Netherlands international footballers
SC Heerenveen players
AZ Alkmaar players
Paris Saint-Germain F.C. players
FC Mulhouse players
UEFA Euro 1976 players
UEFA Euro 1980 players
Eredivisie players
Eerste Divisie players
Ligue 1 players
Ligue 2 players
Dutch expatriate footballers
Dutch expatriate sportspeople in France
Expatriate footballers in France